Gregg F. Martin (born July 16, 1956) is a United States Army two-star general who retired as the Special Assistant to the Chief of Engineers in 2014. From July 2012 to July 2014 he was the President of the National Defense University at Fort McNair Army Base in Washington, D.C. and from July 2010 to July 2012 he served as the Commandant of the U.S. Army War College in Carlisle, PA. He served as second in command for 3rd Army/US Army Central in the Central Command Area of Responsibility, including support operations in Iraq and Afghanistan, and across the CENTCOM region from January 2010 to April 2010 and he led a complex enterprise of four major schools that educated, trained and developed thousands of soldiers, marines, airmen, sailors and civilians for leadership roles in global operations as the Commanding General at the Maneuver Support Center of Excellence in Fort Leonard Wood, Missouri from October 2008 to January 2010. After retiring from the military, General Martin revealed that he is a survivor of bipolar disorder  in an effort to reduce the stigma of that condition.

Early life 
The son of a World War II sailor and native New Englander, he graduated from Holbrook High School in Holbrook, MA in 1974 and was an Army ROTC walk-on at the University of Maine. He graduated from West Point in 1979 and was commissioned as an Army Engineer. He married Maggie Ryan and has a family of three sons: Philip, Connor, and Pat.

Education 
He graduated from the West Point, U.S. Military Academy (USMA), in 1979 and a Master of Science in Civil Engineering and Technology Policy from Massachusetts Institute of Technology (1988) where he would later earn a Doctor of Philosophy in Engineering and Public Policy in 1992.

Service career 
As career Engineer Officer (20 years) in the US Army Martin served at Fort Belvoir, Fort Benning, Germany, Fort Lewis, Honduras, and Fort Leonard Wood as a combat and construction engineer. He first attended the Engineer Officer Basic and Advanced Courses at Fort Belvoir; continued his training at Ranger and Airborne School in Fort Benning; and began his career serving on the frontlines of the Cold War in 1979 as Platoon Leader, Company Commander, and Project Engineer in Germany defending the free world from the Soviet Union. After his 6 year tour in Germany Martin continued his service at Fort Lewis as an Engineer Staff Officer with I Corps and the 864th Engineer Battalion. This was followed by a year of service in Honduras as the Engineer Staff Officer for the Joint Task Force Bravo and a two year tour as a Commander of the 5th Engineer Battalion at Fort Leonard Wood, MO.

From January 1995 to June 1997 Martin serve as the Instructor and Course Director of the Department of Social Sciences at West Point where he taught and developed courses on American Politics, International Relations, and the Politics of Defense Policy. From June 2000 to June 2002 he was the Instructor and Course Director of Senior Leadership and Command Instruction at the US Army War College in Carlisle, PA. He designed

From 2002 to June 2004 Martin served as the Commander of the 130th Engineer Brigade. He trained and deployed a 3-battalion 1700-soldier brigade from Germany to Kuwait, where the force joined the attack of Iraq, as an essential element of the initial assault on Baghdad. The Brigade received American and Allied units from around the world and expanded to more than 20 battalions and 13,000 troops, conducting full spectrum engineer operations across the breadth and depth of Iraq from 2003 to 2004.

Martin continued his service as the Deputy G3/5/7 of US Army Europe and 7th Army coordinating operations, planning, training, and international activities for US Army Forces in Europe, Africa, and the Middle East (deployed force into Iraq and Afghanistan). From July 2005 to October 2007 he served as the U.S. Army Corps of Engineers, Northwestern Division Commander and Division Engineer of a $2Bn program encompassing Military Construction, Civil Works, Environmental and Disaster Preparedness over a 14 state region. Martin was a Presidential appointee on the Mississippi River Commission and also took part in support efforts for Hurricane Katrina.

He led a complex enterprise of four major schools that educated, trained and developed thousands of soldiers, marines, airmen, sailors and civilians for leadership roles in global operations as the Commanding General at the Maneuver Support Center of Excellence in Fort Leonard Wood, Missouri from October 2008 to January 2010. He served as second in command for 3rd Army/US Army Central in the Central Command Area of Responsibility, including support operations in Iraq and Afghanistan, and across the CENTCOM region from January 2010 to April 2010. From July 2010 to June 2012 Martin presided as the Commandant of the US Army War College in Carlisle, PA and the President of the National Defense University from July 2012 to July 2014. He retired as the Special Assistant to the Chief of Engineers (Major General US Army Corps of Engineers) working towards the Corps' 2025 Future Posture, emphasizing national infrastructure development, optimizing value for Federal engineering and facilities construction.

References 

1956 births
Living people
United States Army generals
United States Military Academy alumni
Presidents of the National Defense University
Place of birth missing (living people)
United States Army War College faculty
Massachusetts Institute of Technology alumni